Ranks and insignia of the Reichsbahn show the grades, titles, and rank insignia of the Deutsche Reichsbahn during the period 1935–1945.

Pay grades, titles, and army equivalent

Uniform regulations of 1935

Uniform regulations of 1941

The first uniform regulations of 1941 exchanged the pips on the epaulets for rosettes. They also introduced collar patches denoting career groups.

References

Nazi paramilitary ranks